On Ice  may refer to:

 On Ice (film), a 1935 Mickey Mouse cartoon
 On Ice (Bambee album), 1998
 On Ice (Machine Gun Fellatio album), 2004
 "On Ice", an episode of the TV series Counterstrike
 A phrase used in the names of various ice shows

See also 
 On the Ice, a 2011 American film